is a turn-based strategy video game, and the first game in the Culdcept series. It has drawn comparisons to other modern strategy titles, and also shares features with non-video games Monopoly and Magic: The Gathering. The game was initially released only in Japan for the Sega Saturn and PlayStation (as Culdcept Expansion), but was ported to the Nintendo DS in 2008 as Culdcept DS.

Gameplay
In Culdcept, the player takes on the role of a Cepter. Cepters are beings that have the ability to use magical cards to summon creatures, cast spells, and perform various other feats of wizardry. As players advance through the game, they earn additional cards that they can use to create customized "books" (decks of 50 cards) with which to better defeat their foes.

Although the game is relatively intricate, it slowly nurtures the player through basic game concepts. By acting as an arbiter and automatically enforcing the rules, game complexity is kept to manageable levels. After enough sessions, players should be able to figure out various strategies and be able to effectively practice deck optimization techniques.

Mechanics
Gameplay resembles Monopoly in that players roll a die (or two dice with certain spells) to move around on a game board.  However, instead of buying the property and putting houses and hotels on it, players instead summon a creature to defend the property with cards—the Magic: The Gathering aspect of the game. If an opponent lands on a property that one owns, the opponent either pays a toll, or can choose to attack the defending creature with one of their own in order to attempt to take over the property. Unlike Monopoly, this can result in one losing a piece of land after considerable investment.

There are four property colors that represent different terrain types, e.g. green = forest. The more a player invests in the property to "level it up" (ala adding houses or a hotel in Monopoly), the more the terrain flourishes (e.g. forests become more dense with trees). This then provides additional defense to creatures of the matching color type, and exacts a higher toll on opponents landing there. And as a player collects more lands of the same color (creating "chains") the tolls, as well of the land values, increase.

Culdcept also includes item cards that can be played during battle to help attack, defend, or manipulate the battle in a number of other ways. Along with creature and item cards are spell cards that cause other various effects to creatures, territories, and Cepters.

Reception
On release, Famitsu magazine scored the 1999 PS1 expansion of the game a 35 out of 40.

References

External links
Culdcept Official Site (Japanese)
 Culdcept Central (English)

Culdcept
1997 video games
Digital collectible card games
Nintendo 3DS games
Nintendo 3DS eShop games
Nintendo DS games
Nintendo Network games
Sega Saturn games
PlayStation (console) games
PlayStation 2 games
PlayStation Network games
Tokyopop titles
Video games scored by Yuzo Koshiro
Video games with expansion packs
Video games developed in Japan